The List of Cayman Island hurricanes covers all hurricanes and tropical storms affecting the Cayman Islands from 1700 to 2021.

1700s
September 1731 - First known recorded tropical cyclone to affect the Cayman Islands.
September 1735 - A storm strikes the Cayman Islands, but no details are available.
August 1751 - A storm causes high waves in Pedro St. James.
August 28, 1785 - The first known tropical cyclone to affect Cayman Islands to be described in detail.
October 1793 - A storm causes devastation in the Cayman Islands, with records stating that the population was still struggling to recover in February 1794.

1800s
October 1812 - A late-season hurricane strikes Grand Cayman.
September 28 and October 27, 1837, or 1838 - Two hurricanes affect the Cayman Islands causing significant damage, though the year is disputed due to conflicting reports.
October 10, 1846 - The Great Havana Hurricane of 1846 travels across the Cayman Islands, producing high winds.
October 17, 1876 - The Cuba-South Florida Hurricane of 1876 passes just east of Grand Cayman, causing significant damage.

1900s
Jun 11, 1901 - Tropical Storm One 
Jul 6–7, 1901 - Tropical Storm Two
September 14–15, 1901 - Hurricane Eight 
August 11, 1903 - The 1903 Jamaica hurricane passes through the Cayman Islands, bringing winds of 120 miles per hour and a minimum pressure of 958 mbar. Though the hurricane passed through quickly it was very destructive with the Governor later stating "Although the storm was of short duration, the results were tragic.". More than 200 houses and seven of the eight churches on Grand Cayman were destroyed or heavily damaged, while in the harbor only one of the 23 ships present survived. The worst damage happened in the northern parts of Grand Cayman. Many of the crew on board the ships in the harbor were killed but the loss of life on Grand Cayman was minimal.
October 14–15, 1904 - Hurricane Four was first noted about 185 miles South South East of Jamaica on the 12th moving North West passing South and West of Jamaica. It then moved North as it moved into the Cayman area and strengthened. During the afternoon of the 14th it made landfall on Cayman Brac and became a hurricane before leaving the Cayman area. 
November 5–7, 1906 - Hurricane Eleven formed as a Tropical Depression on the 5th just South South West of Grand Cayman the system slowly moved North and became Tropical Storm just off Western Grand Cayman that day. The Tropical storm then slowly turned North East then East North East passing near North Western and Northern Grand Cayman intensifying while doing so during the 6th. By the 7th the storm was now a hurricane leaving the Cayman area and heading to Cuba.  
July 17–18, 1909 - The 1909 Velasco hurricane moved across the Caribbean into the Cayman area and passing just to the West side of Grand Cayman before departing the area. 
August 6–7, 1909 - Tropical Storm Five formed as Tropical Depression on the 6th just South West of Jamaica and was moving NW across the North West Caribbean passing near Western Grand Cayman and before leaving the Cayman area strengthening to Tropical Storm. 
August 24, 1909 - The 1909 Monterrey hurricane passes just north of the Cayman Islands. Recorded rainfall in George Town was 6 inches; Bodden Town was 6.25 inches; and East End was 12.32 inches. Trees were blown across the roads and roads were under three feet of water. After the storm many of the trees were hauled back into position and, which took root afresh the following year. Most of the damage from the hurricane was done to ships in dock at Grand Cayman and Cayman Brac.
September 15–16, 1909 - The 1909 Grand Isle hurricane formed as a Tropical Depression South of Hispaniola on the 13th. The system would maintain Tropical Depression status for a couple days as it passed near the North Coast of Jamaica. Tt would then become Tropical Storm just off of North West Jamaica early on the 15th and entering the Cayman area later that day. The storm would pass just North of Grand Cayman late on the 15th going into the 16th and before leaving the Cayman area it then became a hurricane. 
October 8–9, 1909 - The 1909 Florida Keys hurricane formed in the South West Caribbean on the 6th the storm moved North West into the North West Caribbean and slowed down and turned a bit more West North West as it neared the Cayman area around the 8th. The storm then quickly intensified into a Major hurricane just passing of Grand Cayman's West side. The Major Hurricane started to move out of the Cayman area late hours of the 9th into early hours of the 10th.

1910s
October 12, 1910 - The 1910 Cuba hurricane brushes Grand Cayman with minimal damage.
August or September 1914 - There were multiple reports of a tropical storm that developed in the northwest Caribbean with a minimum pressure of 1004 mbar. There are conflicting reports for an exact location and whether or not it was deemed a tropical depression or tropical storm. As such, this storm was never recorded to the HURDAT or in the HURDAT reanalysis in 2005.
August 13, 1915 - The 1915 Galveston hurricane devastates the Cayman Islands. Three-fourths of the 270 houses on Cayman Brac were destroyed, leaving 1,800 people destitute. Nearly all of the island's coconut trees were destroyed, while half of the coconut trees on Little Cayman were drowned. All buildings in Little Cayman were destroyed. Several schooners were driven ashore by the storm, and another bearing oil and gasoline cargo was lost. Ten people were killed after the schooner Curaçao bound for Grand Cayman sank offshore. Hundreds of cattle and swine were killed on Grand Cayman. Recently completed government buildings there were displaced from their foundations.
September 24, 1915 - Hurricane Four brushes the Cayman Islands, causing waves bigger in size then any since the Great Havana Hurricane of 1846.
September 24, 1917 - The 1917 Nueva Gerona hurricane strikes Grand Cayman. The storm resulted in the complete destruction of all provision grounds. Two people died, with 100 houses demolished. Fourteen vessels ran ashore with all but one being refloated.
August, 1918 - Hurricane One also known as The Louisiana Hurricane of 1918 passes near Grand Cayman as a Tropical Storm.
September 13–14, 1918 - Tropical Storm Six was a weakening Tropical Storm as it passed near Grand Cayman.

1920s
June, 1921 - Tropical Depression One forms near the area and moves northeast into Cuba and the Bahamas.
October, 1921 - The 1921 Tampa Bay hurricane passes to the West of Grand Cayman, generating high winds, rain and rough seas.
October, 1922 - Hurricane Four passes near Grand Cayman quickly strengthening from a Tropical Depression to Hurricane as it passes by.
October, 1922 - Tropical Storm Five passes near Grand Cayman as a Tropical Storm as it was moving north.
November, 1925 - The 1925 Florida tropical storm forms in the far northwest Caribbean and moves southeast near the Cayman area then turns northwest passing just west of Grand Cayman then on to Cuba then into Florida.
August, 1926 - The 1926 Louisiana hurricane passes just west of Grand Cayman as a Tropical Storm.
September, 1926 - Tropical Storm Six moves around the Cayman area as a Tropical Depression before making landfall in Cuba.
October, 1926 - The 1926 Havana–Bermuda hurricane passes west of Grand Cayman as a Category 4 Hurricane.
October, 1927 - Tropical Storm Six passes through the Cayman Islands as a Tropical Storm as it traveled northeast over the northwest Caribbean Seas and into Cuba.
October 30, 1927 - Tropical Storm Seven forms over Cayman Brac and moves north east.
August, 1928 - The 1928 Haiti hurricane passes just east of Cayman Brac and Little Cayman as a weakening Tropical Storm.
September, 1928 - Tropical Storm Three passes just south of Grand Cayman as a Tropical Storm.

1930s
September, 1930 - The 1930 Dominican Republic hurricane passes near Cayman Brac and Little Cayman and just north of Grand Cayman as a Tropical storm.
October, 1931 - Tropical Storm Ten forms in the northwest Caribbean Sea, it moved northeast and moved just northwest of Grand Cayman.
November, 1931 - Tropical Storm Eleven formed just West southwest of Grand Cayman and stagnates in that area throughout its lifetime.
November 7, 1932 - The 1932 Cuba hurricane passes through the Cayman Islands and passed very close to Cayman Brac as a high end Category 4 hurricane after weakening from a Category 5 just before the eye passed by. On Cayman Brac there was a reported pressure of 939 mbar. This hurricane remains the deadliest hurricane in Cayman history killing around 109 people. The hurricane also became the second most destructive hurricane to impact the Cayman Islands following behind 2004's Hurricane Ivan.
July 2, 1933 - The 1933 Trinidad hurricane passes through Grand Cayman causing storm surges and damaging what was left after the 1932 Cuba hurricane devastated the area.
August 16–17, 1933 - Tropical Storm Seven formed in the Eastern Caribbean on the 14th and treked West to West North West across the Caribbean. Tropical Storm Seven made landfall over Eastern Grand Cayman during late and into early hours of the 16th to 17th and moves away from Cayman later that day. 
 October 3, 1933 - The 1933 Cuba-Bahamas hurricane formed in the Western Caribbean E of Eastern Honduras on the 1st. It quickly became a hurricane West of Jamaica and South of Grand Cayman. Hurricane passed on the West side of Grand Cayman as it continued to strengthen. Hurricane left the Cayman area late evening of the 3rd into early hours of the 4th. 
September 27, 1935 - The 1935 Cuba hurricane passes through Little Cayman and Cayman Brac. There were reports of houses destroyed in Cayman Brac.
August 12, 1938 - Hurricane Three passes over Grand Cayman as a Category 2 Hurricane.
August 24, 1938 - Hurricane Four passes near Grand Cayman with winds reaching  on Grand Cayman.
November, 1938 - Tropical Storm Nine passes near Grand Cayman as a weakening storm.
October 31, 1939 - Hurricane Six passes over Grand Cayman and just south of Cayman Brac and Little Cayman. In Grand Cayman, winds from the storm reached  with a minimum pressure of 990.0 hectopascals (29.23 inHg). The storm caused considerable damage on the Cayman Islands.

1940s
August, 1942 - The 1942 Matagorda hurricane passes Grand Cayman just to the southwest as a Tropical Storm and intensifies to a hurricane west of Grand Cayman.
November, 1942 - The 1942 Belize hurricane passes Grand Cayman to the northwest as it was moving southwest across the area.
October 15, 1944 - The 1944 Cuba-Florida hurricane passes through Grand Cayman bringing four days of torrential rains that produced rainfall totals reaching  on Grand Cayman that flooded Cayman becoming the rainiest Tropical cyclone to hit the Cayman Islands, causing hurricane-force winds up to 116 miles per hour, rough seas and causing sand to submerge West Bay Road several feet deep.
October 12, 1945 - Hurricane Eleven moves over the Cayman Islands as a Hurricane before moving into Cuba.
September 21, 1947 - Tropical Storm Six "How" moves northwest and slowly intensifies as it passes near Cayman Brac.
September 19, 1948 - The September 1948 Florida hurricane forms near Jamaica then moves over Grand Cayman as quickly intensifies to a Hurricane. Offshore Grand Cayman, the British steamer Lochmonar, with 72 people aboard, encounters the hurricane on September 19. The ship ran aground in seas that were "as rough as hell". They were safely rescued by a United States Coast Guard tugboat on September 20.

1950s
September 1, 1950 - Hurricane Easy forms as a Tropical Storm just West of Grand Cayman.
October 16, 1950 - Hurricane King forms in the West Caribbean and moves East over the northwest Caribbean Seas passing just southeast of Cayman Brac and Little Cayman.
October 14, 1951 - A Tropical Storm Item forms southwest of Jamaica on October 12, it intensified on October 13. It turned toward the north, and the next day attained peak winds of  after moving near Grand Cayman.
October 23, 1952 - Hurricane Fox moves near Grand Cayman as a Category 3 Hurricane.
 May 29–30, 1953 - Tropical Storm Alice (1953) formed in the South West Caribbean on the 25th and moved generally North over the Western Caribbean passing just West of Grand Cayman late on 29th through the 30th. 
September 23, 1953 - Hurricane Florence passes near Grand Cayman to the southwest as a Tropical Storm.
October 4–5, 1958 - Hurricane Janice formed on the late morning of the 4th just South of Grand Cayman as Tropical Depression and quickly became Tropical Storm Janice. from the overnight to early hours 4th to 5th Janice made landfall on Grand Cayman Janice moved out of the Cayman area late on the 5th.

1960s
October 29, 1961 - Hurricane Hattie passes just South West of Grand Cayman bringing heavy rainfall. At least  of rain were reported on the island, including  in six hours. Winds on Grand Cayman were not very strong, and only minor damage was reported due to the rain.
June 28, 1966 - Unnamed Tropical Storm forms as Tropical Depression just West of North West Grand Cayman.
May 31, 1969 - Tropical Depression forms in South West Caribbean around 29 May and moves north to North North East passing near Grand Cayman on the May 31. 
June 8, 1969 - Tropical Depression forms just SW of Grand Cayman moving North passing close to Western Grand Cayman.
August 14, 1969 - Hurricane Camille Forms and passed near Cayman Islands.
August 29, 1969 - Hurricane Francelia passes near Grand Cayman bringing heavy rainfall with 0.56in within a 16hrs period.

1970s
May 21–23, 1970 - The slow moving Hurricane Alma moves through the Cayman Islands.
November 14–18, 1971 - The slow moving Tropical Storm Laura moves near Grand Cayman causing 3in of rain.
October 16–18, 1973 - Tropical Storm Gilda (1973) Formed as Tropical Depression South of Grand Cayman near the mid way point between Jamaica Honduras and Grand Cayman. the Depression slowly moved North North Eastwards and strengthens to Tropical Storm about 60 miles E of Grand Cayman and just before making landfall on Cayman Brac in the overnight into morning hours of 17–18 October. Gilda moved away from Cayman after that.   
August 26, 1975 - Hurricane Caroline moves through Cayman Islands.
September 19, 1975 - The eye of Hurricane Eloise moves near Cayman Islands.
October 17, 1977 - Tropical Storm Frieda moves near Grand Cayman caused 5.42in of rain in 36hrs.
June 11–13, 1979 - Tropical Depression One Formed around 230 miles South of Grand Cayman. the Depression slowly drifted North East passing close to Cayman Brac through the overnight into early morning hours 12 to 13 June and leaving the Cayman area later on the 13th. 
October 16, 1979 - Tropical Depression Fourteen moves near Grand Cayman.

1980s
August 6, 1980 - Hurricane Allen moves over Cayman Brac and Little Cayman, passing along north coast of Grand Cayman. Allen brings 135 mile per hour winds, which causes damage to houses and utility poles.
May 7, 1981 - Tropical Storm Arlene (1981) forms west of Grand Cayman on the 6th. The Arlene system moves east passing just south of Grand Cayman and near Little Cayman and Cayman Brac before moving to Cuba. The system brought Tropical Storm Conditions to the Islands.
November 6, 1981 - Hurricane Katrina (1981) Forms 150 miles South of Grand Cayman. As it moves North it passes near to Grand Cayman causing a foot of flooding. Cayman Brac experiences a tornado which causes damage to foliage at the Brac Reef Hotel bar.
August 12, 1985 - Hurricane Danny (1985) Formed just South of Grand Cayman as a Tropical Depression in the early hours of 12, August during the remainder of the morning the Depression had a near direct hit on Grand Cayman with its poorly organised circulation. the Depression moved away from Grand Cayman later that day.
November 1, 1987 - Tropical Depression Fourteen (1987) Formed South of Jamaica on the 31st, October and moved North West and made a direct landfall on Little Cayman the Morning of the 1st, November.
September 13, 1988 - Hurricane Gilbert passes through Grand Cayman bringing winds up to 156 miles per hour.

1990s
October 17, 1996 - Hurricane Lili passes to the northeast of Grand Cayman.
November 25, 1996 - Hurricane Marco passes southwest of Grand Cayman as a tropical storm.
October 25, 1998 - Hurricane Mitch passes southwest of Grand Cayman as a Category 5 hurricane. Damage is moderate to light with a few blown-out windows, beach erosion, damaged docks, one sunken dive vessel, and it forces flights to be cancelled.
October 13, 1999 - Hurricane Irene passes just to the west of Grand Cayman.
November 13, 1999 - Hurricane Lenny forms south of the Cayman Islands.

2000s

September 19, 2000 - Tropical Storm Helene passes through the Cayman Islands producing strong winds, rain, and rough seas.
October 7, 2001 - Hurricane Iris hits Central America bringing heavy rain and strong winds to the Cayman Islands.
November 4, 2001 - Hurricane Michelle passes Grand Cayman, Producing strong winds, heavy rains, rough seas and high storm surge especially on the southwest and the north coast of Grand Cayman.
September 9, 2002 - Hurricane Isidore passes through the Cayman Islands causing tropical storm force winds.
September 30, 2002 - Hurricane Lili passes over Little Cayman and Cayman Brac hitting the Cayman Islands as a category 1 hurricane.
August 12, 2004 - Hurricane Charley passes between Grand Cayman and its sister islands of Cayman Brac and Little Cayman bringing rains, strong winds and rough seas.
The storm surge from the hurricane flooded all of Grand Cayman Island. Ivan killed two people in the Cayman Islands, and left US$2.86 billion in damage.
June 9, 2005 - Tropical Storm Arlene becomes an eastern bound storm as the center of the storm passes just west of Grand Cayman, causing heavy rains and tropical storm force winds.
July 8, 2005 - Hurricane Dennis passes near Cayman Brac and Little Cayman.
July 17, 2005 - Hurricane Emily passes by Grand Cayman as a major hurricane. producing heavy rains, strong winds, rough seas and storm surge.
October 18, 2005 - Hurricane Wilma forms just Southeast of the Cayman Islands and just offshore of Jamaica and moves slowly around the Cayman area and rapidly intensified from a tropical Storm to a Category 5 Hurricane around the 18 and 19 of October. producing heavy rains, strong winds, rough seas and storm surge.
June 10, 2006 - Subtropical Storm Alberto forms just west of Grand Cayman, producing heavy rainfall across the area. A station on Grand Cayman reported  of rain in a 24-hour period.
August 20, 2007 - Hurricane Dean a strong category 4 Hurricane passes Grand Cayman to South and West producing heavy rains, heavy winds, rough seas, and storm surge.
December 13, 2007 - Tropical Storm Olga (2007) Remnants move through the Cayman Islands causing some rains and strong winds.
July 20, 2008 - Hurricane Dolly forms just off Southwest Grand Cayman it brought heavy rains and strong winds to Grand Cayman.
August 17, 2008 - Tropical Storm Fay passes near Cayman Brac, bringing storm conditions and rains and rough seas.
August 30, 2008 - Hurricane Gustav moves through the Cayman Islands.
September 8, 2008 - Hurricane Ike crosses southeast Cuba and enters the northwest Caribbean Sea bringing storm conditions to the Cayman Islands.
November 8, 2008 - Hurricane Paloma makes a near landfall on Grand Cayman as a major hurricane and makes landfall on Cayman Brac as Category 4 hurricane. Hurricane cause moderate damage to Grand Cayman and serious damage to Cayman Brac.
November 7, 2009 - Hurricane Ida passes just west of Grand Cayman bringing heavy rains and strong winds as well as rough seas.

2010s
September 28, 2010 - Tropical Storm Nicole causes heavy rain.
October 24, 2011 - Hurricane Rina passes to the southwest and west of Grand Cayman Causing moderate to heavy rains.
August 6, 2012 - Hurricane Ernesto passes to the southwest of Grand Cayman causing heavy rains strong winds and rough seas.
August 2, 2016 - Hurricane Earl passes to the south and west of Grand Cayman, bringing heavy rains, strong winds and rough seas.
June 17, 2017 - Tropical Storm Cindy Tropical Disturbance develops into Tropical Storm Cindy causing heavy rains in Grand Cayman.
August 7, 2017 - Hurricane Franklin passes to the southwest of Grand Cayman causing heavy rains.
August 21, 2017 - Hurricane Harvey in a weakened state passes to the south and west of Grand Cayman causing stormy skies and moderate to heavy showers.
October 6, 2017 - Hurricane Nate passes to the West of Grand Cayman, bands causing heavy rains and strong winds.
October 28, 2017 - Tropical Storm Philippe passes by Grand Cayman, bringing heavy rains and tropical storm force winds.
 October 7, 2018 - Hurricane Michael forms to the West of Grand Cayman and moves North, causing heavy rains, strong winds and rough seas.

2020s
August 24, 2020 - Hurricane Laura passes to the northeast of Cayman Brac, Little Cayman, and Grand Cayman, bringing heavy rains and rough seas that beach and sink small crafts at Grand Cayman and brings storm force winds to Cayman Brac and Little Cayman.
August 21, 2020 - Tropical Storm Marco passes to the south and west of Grand Cayman, bringing rains and strong winds.
September 1, 2020 - Tropical Storm Nana passes to the south of Grand Cayman, bringing rains and strong winds.
October 2, 2020 - Tropical Storm Gamma passes to the south and west of Grand Cayman, bringing heavy rains.
October 6, 2020 - Hurricane Delta rapidly intensifies to a Category 4 hurricane about 200 km from the islands on 6 October, with its closest approach to Grand Cayman just after reaching category 4 intensity. The storm caused little impact other than wave action, but government-driven safety preparations were intense due to COVID-19 effectively shutting down the country for 48 hours. Grand Cayman was affected with heavy rains, strong winds, rough seas and minor storm surge that damaged a few seaside docks on the south side of the island.
October 24–26, 2020 - Hurricane Zeta caused heavy rains and rough seas, as well as strong winds for Grand Cayman.
November 1–2 and 7–8,2020 - Tropical Storm Eta brings tropical storm force winds and reports of a tornado ripping up power poles and trees. Eta caused moderate flooding and storm surge. A little over 20,000 customers lose power. Along with CERT Teams, The Cayman Islands Regiment was deployed to the area to assist with evacuations and recovery operations.
July 4–5, 2021 - Tropical Storm Elsa impacted the islands with heavy rain and strong winds causing flash floods and outages.
 August 18, 2021 - Hurricane Grace impacted all of the Cayman Island, a direct hit hit on Grand Cayman, which caused damage to all of Grand Cayman, and some minor impacts to Little Cayman and Cayman Brac. Grace caused some heavy rainfall and storm surge flooding to parts of Grand Cayman. The Cayman Islands Regiment was deployed on HADR mission to rescue persons and to clear the blocked roads and clear debris. 
August 26–27, 2021 - Hurricane Ida impacted all 3 islands with a near landfall occurring on the eastern portion of Grand Cayman. The worst of the impacts were felt on Cayman Brac and Little Cayman. The Cayman Islands Regiment were deployed to all of the Islands.
 September 25–27, 2022 - Hurricane Ian impacted all the islands but impacted Grand Cayman the most. The Cayman Islands Regiment saw full deployment of the Regiment the Cayman Islands Coast Guard was also deployed and addition support by the deployed Royal Navy HMS Medway.
 November 1, 2022 - Hurricane Lisa impacted Grand Cayman and no impacts to Little Cayman and Cayman Brac. Impacts were considered to be mild with some moderate showers and occasional gusty winds as well as some rough seas. A Tropical Storm Watch was issued for Grand Cayman only.

Climatology

Deadly Atlantic storms 
List of Atlantic tropical storms that caused fatalities in the Cayman Islands

Storms with high rainfall
List of Atlantic tropical storms and hurricanes that produced the highest amount of rainfall in the Cayman Islands

See also

List of Cuba hurricanes
List of Jamaica hurricanes
List of Hispaniola hurricanes
Hurricanes in the Bahama Archipelago

References

Cayman Islands